Caleb John Raleigh (born November 26, 1996) is an American professional baseball catcher for the Seattle Mariners of Major League Baseball (MLB). He made his MLB debut in 2021. His nickname is Big Dumper.

Amateur career
Raleigh attended Smoky Mountain High School in Sylva, North Carolina. He enrolled at Florida State University (FSU) and played college baseball for the Florida State Seminoles. In 2016, he played collegiate summer baseball with the Harwich Mariners of the Cape Cod Baseball League. In 2018, his junior year at FSU, he slashed .326/.447/.583 with 13 home runs and 54 RBIs over 62 games. After the season, he was drafted by the Seattle Mariners in the third round of the 2018 Major League Baseball draft.

Professional career

Minor leagues
Raleigh made his professional debut with the Low-A Everett AquaSox, batting .288 with eight home runs and 29 RBIs in 38 games. He started 2019 with the High-A Modesto Nuts, with whom he was named a California League All-Star, before being promoted to the Double-A Arkansas Travelers. Over 121 games between the two clubs, Raleigh slashed .251/.323/.497 with 29 home runs and 82 RBIs.

Raleigh did not play in a game in 2020 due to the cancellation of the minor league season because of the COVID-19 pandemic. To begin the 2021 season, he was assigned to the Triple-A Tacoma Rainiers, and hit .324/.377/.608 with 9 home runs and 36 RBI in 44 games.

Seattle Mariners
On July 11, 2021, Raleigh was selected to the 40-man roster and promoted to the major leagues for the first time. He made his MLB debut on July 11, starting at catcher in a game against the Los Angeles Angels, going 0–4 with two strikeouts. Raleigh recorded his first career hits and RBIs on July 20 in a win against the Colorado Rockies. On July 23, Raleigh hit his first career home run, a two-run shot off  Oakland Athletics starter Frankie Montas. He finished the 2021 season with a .180/.223/.309 slash line, 25 hits, 12 doubles, 2 home runs, 13 RBIs and 52 strikeouts, all in 47 games. 

Raleigh began the 2022 season on the major league roster but remained with Tacoma. He then returned to the Mariners on May 7 to replace injured catcher Tom Murphy and became a major offensive talent to help the team to seven wins in ten games by June. On September 30, Raleigh hit a pinch-hit, walk-off home run against the Oakland Athletics to clinch the Mariners' first playoff trip since their 2001 season, ending the longest active playoff drought amongst the four major North American sports leagues. Raleigh had 27 home runs by the end of the season, leading all catchers in MLB and setting a new Mariners record. He would also have a huge role in the Mariners postseason. In the Wild Card series against the Toronto Blue Jays, Raleigh hit a two run home run off of Alek Manoah, an RBI hit off of Anthony Bass, and scored the winning run in game two. He finished the 2022 season with a .211/.284/.489 slash line, 78 hits, 20 doubles, a triple, 27 home runs, and 63 runs batted in across his 119 games. He was a nominee for both Gold Glove and Silver Slugger at the catcher position, but he lost out to the New York Yankees Jose Trevino (baseball) and Toronto Blue Jays Alejandro Kirk respectively.

References

External links

1996 births
Living people
People from Jackson County, North Carolina
Baseball players from North Carolina
Major League Baseball catchers
Seattle Mariners players
Florida State Seminoles baseball players
Harwich Mariners players
Everett AquaSox players
Modesto Nuts players
Arkansas Travelers players
Tacoma Rainiers players